Ceratobarys is a genus of frit flies in the family Chloropidae. There is one described species in Ceratobarys, C. eulophus.

References

Further reading

 

Oscinellinae
Articles created by Qbugbot